Deana is a monotypic moth genus of the family Crambidae described by Arthur Gardiner Butler in 1859. It contains only one species, Deana hybreasalis, which is endemic to New Zealand.

The larvae feed on various liana species, including Clematis species (Ranunculaceae).

References

Spilomelinae
Endemic fauna of New Zealand
Moths of New Zealand
Crambidae genera
Taxa named by Arthur Gardiner Butler
Monotypic moth genera
Endemic moths of New Zealand